Emma Beiter Bomme (born 28 June 1998) is a Danish sprinter.

Beiter Bomme competes in the 60m, 100m and 200m. She ran for Denmark in the 4 × 100 metres relay at the 2020 Summer Olympics, where they finished seventh in their heat.

Personal life
Her mother Charlotte Beiter won the Danish national heptathlon title and later served as athletics director at the Sparta Atletik club in Copenhagen, Denmark. Her father Carsten Bomme is the former Danish national decathlon champion and later worked as an athletics coach.

References

1998 births
Living people
Danish female sprinters
Athletes (track and field) at the 2020 Summer Olympics
Olympic athletes of Denmark
20th-century Danish women
21st-century Danish women